Éistibh, a Luchd an Tighe-se, otherwise Listen, People of this House is a poem dated to  (see 1500 in poetry), composed by Iseabail Ní Mheic Cailéin, a daughter of Colin Campbell, 1st Earl of Argyll (died 1493).

Thomas Owen Clancy notes that Éistibh, a Luchd an Tighe-se "is a fairly obscene boast to the court circle on the size and potency of her household priest's penis. The authenticity of the attribution to Iseabail has been questioned, but without substantial grounds." "Diplomatic" editions were published in the 20th century, and only in 2008 was the unexpurgated text, with translation, published.

The text
Original text

Estyf, a lucht in ti so,
re skail na bod breour,
dy hantyth mo chreissy
cwt dane skallow dy screyf.

Da leneour bod braiwillycht
dy vy sin amsyr royn,
tak far in nvrd ċrawe so
bod is ċaf mor roynne.

Bod mo haggird horistil
ga ty go fad sessowyt,
otha keynn an quhallavir
in reyf ata na vackann.

Atta reyf roiravyr
an sin sne skail breg,
notcha cholai choyravyr
woa vod arriss es.
Estyve.

Modern Scottish Gaelic spelling

Éistibh, a luchd an tighe-se
re sgeul na bod brìoghmhar
do shanntaich mo chridhe-sa
cuid dana sgeulaibh do sgríobhadh.

Ce lìonmhor bod brèagh-bhileach
do bhi san aimsir romhainn
ta aig fear an ùird chràbhaidh seo
bod as gu mór righinn.

Bod mo shagairt thuarasdail
ce ta gu fada seasmhach
o tha céin ni chualabhair
an reabh atà ina mhacan.

Atá a riabh ro-reamhar
an sin's ni he sgeul bréagach
nocha chuala gu reamhar
mhotha bhod aris. Éistibh.

Translation

Listen, people of this house,
to the tale of the powerful penis
which has made my heart greedy.
I will write some of the tale.

Although many beautiful tree-like penises
have been in the time before,
this man of the religious order
has a penis so big and rigid.

The penis of my household priest,
although it is so long and firm,
the thickness of his manhood
has not been heard of for a long time.

That thick drill  of his,
and it is no word of a lie,
never has its thickness been heard of
or a larger penis.

More Fluent Translation

O Hark ye, ye folk of this house,
To this tale of a powerful prick,
With envy, it makes my heart sick.
Now, to write more of this tale ...

Though there’ve been many dicks like a tree,
In times long gone bye, before me,
This prelate has a prick
That’s so high, hard and thick!

My household-priest’s schlong
Is firm, fat, and lasts long.
The like of his member
Hasn’t been heard of for as long as I can remember.

That thick drill of a prick!
Hark ye, I promise, no lies.
Since Fergus’s dick
I’ve never seen one of that size.

External links

References

 "Poems from the Book of the Dean of Lismore", Quiggin, Cambridge, 1937.
 "Women Poets in Early Medieval Ireland", Thomas Owen Clancy
 "An Leabhar Mór/The Great Book of Gaelic", eds. Theo Dorgan and Malcolm Maclean, 2008.

Erotic poetry
15th-century poems
16th-century poems
Scottish poems
Medieval poetry